XAC may refer to:

 the IATA code for Arcachon - La Teste-de-Buch Airport, France
 the ISO 639-3 code for the Kachari language
 Xinyang Agricultural College
 Xi'an Aircraft Industrial Corporation, also known as Xi'an Aircraft Company Limited
 XacBank, a bank in Mongolia